Neil Alexander Keron (born 24 March 1953) is a British rower who competed in the 1973 European Championships and the 1976 Summer Olympics.

In 1973 he was a crew member of the British boat that finished fourth in the European Championships in Moscow.  In 1976 he was a crew member of the British boat which finished twelfth in the coxless fours event on the stroke side.

Keron was born in Bedford and educated at Bedford Modern School.

References

External links

1953 births
English male rowers
Rowers at the 1976 Summer Olympics
People educated at Bedford Modern School
Living people
Olympic rowers of Great Britain